Baba Jageshwar Intermediate College, Sandwa Khas, Saraianadeo, Pratapgarh
RYS Public Intermediate College, Khandwa, Pratapgarh
Govt Polytechnic, Sultanpur Road, Chilbila
Hemwait Nandan Bahuguna Post Graduate Degree College, Lalganj
Krishi Vigyan Kendra, Avadheshpuram, Lala Bazar, Kalakankar
MDPG College
P B College
Shiv Pati Devi Yamuna Prasad Mishra Balika Inter College, Ajhara, Lalganj, Pratapgarh (Prastavit)
Government Girls Inter College (G.G.I.C.), Pratapgarh, U.P.
Jawahar Navodaya Vidyalaya, Narayanpur, Pratapgarh. U.P.
Sangam International School, Katra Medniganj, Pratapgarh, Uttar Pradesh
Novel International School, Rakhaha Pratapgarh
Sarla Inter College Chamrupur, Pratapgarh
Dev Narayan Inter College, Kachha, Pratapgarh
ATL school(C.B.S.E Board) Katra Road Pratapgarh
Angels Inter College, Shivjipuram, Katara Road, Pratapgarh
Sanskar Global School

S.K. Memorial Foundation Of India, Pratapgarh (U.P)
St Johns Academy, Viveknagar, Pratapgarh
Saraswati Sishu Mandir, Ajeet Nagar, Pratapgarh (U.P.)
B. D Mishra Intermediate College, Tarapur, Pratapgarh
M. P. S Intermediate College, Jethwara, Pratapgarh
Mahatma Gandhi Inter College, Bahunchara-230137, Pratapgarh
Krishna Prasad  Hindu Intermediate College Pratapgarh
G. V. Inter College Delhupur pratapgarh
S.B.P. Inter College Bahuta, Patti, Pratapgarh.
Shivram intermediate college Kushaha Pratapgarh (u.p.)
Ram Narayan Intermediate College, Patti, Pratapgarh.
Prabavati memorial public school(CBSE Board)  Kushaha Pratapgarh (U.P.)
R. S. B. Inter College Baghrai, Pratapgarh 230129 (Up)
Ma Gomati Smarak Degree College Bhav Baghrai Pratapgarh 230201 (UP)
Gyanodaya Vidyalaya Baghrai Pratapgarh 230129 (UP)
Mahadev Prashad intermediate college(M.P.I.C), mahadev nagar, Pratapgarh
Sangipur PG Mahavidyalaya, Sangipur, Pratapgarh
Government Girl Inter College(G.G.I.C.) Sangipur, Pratapgarh
Government Inter College, Sangipur.Pratapgarh
St. Anthony's Inter College, Civil Lines, Pratapgarh
SP Inter College Kunda Luknow-Allahabad National Highway, Pratapgarh
Balbhadra Inter College Deeha Shekpur-Hathigawan GT Road, Pratapgarh
Tulsi Inter College Babuganj Jamethi, Kunda Pratapgarh
Hathigawa Inter College, Hathigawa Road, Kunda Pratapgarh
St. Fransis Convent School, Pratapgarh
Ram Anjor Mishra Inter college, lalganj, pratapgarh
Lords Children School, Cristion Colony, Pratapgarh
Prabhat Academy (I.C.S.E.Board), Pratapgarh
Govt Polytechnic, Sultanpur Road, Chilbila
Angels Inter College, Katra Road, Pratapgarh
Saraswati Vidya Mandir Lalganj Ajhara
P.G College Patti Pratapgarh.
Ram Raj Intermediate College Patti Pratapgarh UP
B.D. Intermediate College Pure Budhidhar Baba Gang Kunda Pratap Garh
M.D.P.G. College Allahabad Road Pratap Garh
P.B.P.G. and Inter College Pratapgarh City
G.I.C. (Government Inter College) Pratap Garh
Madarsa Islameya Noorululoom Harharpur Balkerangang Vishwanathgang Pratapgarh.
Madarsa Islameya Darululoom Basupur Mandhata Pratapgarh
Krishi Vigyan Kendra, Avadheshpuram, Lala Bazar, Kalakankar
Kalu Ram Inter College, Shitalaganj, Pratapgarh.
Rani Rajeshwari Inter College, Dilippur, Pratapgarh
Hemwati Nandan Bahuguna Post Graduate Degree College, Lalganj
Amar Janta Inter Mediate College, Katra Gulab Singh
Abul kalam Inter College
Bharat Singh Inter College Kumhiya Patti Pratapgarh.
Tilak Inter College
Shankar Vidyalaya Inter College, Kataiya, Pratapgarh
Bhadreshwar Inter college Derwa Kunda Pratapgarh.
P. P S Intermediate  College Daudpur Saraimadhai  Pratapgarh
B.B.S.Inter College Barna Lalgopalganj Kunda Pratapgarh
S.J.P.R.N.D.Inter College, Ramapur, Kohandour, Pratapgarh
Brijendra Mani Inter College(BMIC), Kohandour, Pratapgarh
Shweta memorial girls inter college, ashthbhujanagar prtapgarh
L.B.S Sikhsan & prasikshan sansthan entha, kunda, pratapgarh
Lallan Shambhu Inter Mediate College, Harakhpur, Mandhata, pratapgarh.
Joyti Higher Secondary School, Kisun Ganj, Sandwa Chandikan, Pratapgarh.
D.R. Primary School Katra Medniganj Pratapgarh.
G.B.K.S Saryu Inter College
Chatradhari Inter College, lakhpeda, kunda, pratapgarh.
Aatreya Academy (PKG to 5th), Sabzi Mandi Road, Pratapgarh
Aatreya Academy (6th to 12th), Phulwari, Pratapgarh
Kidzee Pre School, 91, Gayatri Nagar, Balipur, Pratapgarh, UP
Manoratham School, 351, Karanpur, Meera Bhawan Chowraha, Pratapgarh, U.P.

References 

Lists of universities and colleges in Uttar Pradesh
Pratapgarh district, Uttar Pradesh
Universities and colleges in Uttar Pradesh by district